Minster is a village in Auglaize and Shelby counties, in the U.S. state of Ohio. The population was 2,805 at the 2010 census. It is included in the Wapakoneta, Ohio Micropolitan Statistical Area. It is adjacent to the village of New Bremen to the north.

Minster is the home of the world's largest yogurt plant, operated by Dannon, which employs more than 400 people. The Minster Machine Company is also headquartered in Minster.

History
Founded in 1832 as Stallostown (for its founder Francis Stallo), the village changed its name to Minster in 1836 (after the heavily Roman Catholic region of Münster in Westphalia, from which many of the settlers came). Minster was founded as part of Mercer County, but it was given to Auglaize County when it was created in 1848. It was mostly comprised from the beginning by German settlers coming from Cincinnati by way of the Miami-Erie Canal bringing their farming skills and Catholic faith with them. Most of the roads in Minster were originally named after places in Germany and surrounding areas. For example, Webster St. was known as Berlin St.. It was named after Berlin, Germany. Hamilton St. was known as Vienna St., and it was named after Vienna, Austria, Jefferson St. was known as Oldenburg St., and it was named for Oldenburg, Germany. A Yearly Oktoberfest is celebrated commending Minster's vast history and German roots.

Geography
Minster is located at  (40.393706, -84.378266).

Demographics

2010 census
As of the census of 2010, there were 2,805 people, 1,045 households, and 741 families living in the village. The racial makeup of the village was 99.3% White, 0.1% Asian, 0.1% Pacific Islander, and 0.4% from two or more races. Hispanic or Latino of any race were 0.7% of the population.

There were 1,045 households, of which 34.1% had children under the age of 18 living with them, 63.2% were married couples living together, 4.8% had a female householder with no husband present, 3.0% had a male householder with no wife present, and 29.1% were non-families. 25.8% of all households were made up of individuals, and 12% had someone living alone who was 65 years of age or older. The average household size was 2.60 and the average family size was 3.18.

The median age in the village was 39.9 years. 28.9% of residents were under the age of 18; 4.5% were between the ages of 18 and 24; 22.3% were from 25 to 44; 27.2% were from 45 to 64; and 16.9% were 65 years of age or older. The gender makeup of the village was 49.7% male and 50.3% female.

2000 census
As of the census of 2000, there were 2,794 people, 999 households, and 748 families living in the village. The population density was 1,488.1 people per square mile (573.8/km2). There were 1,033 housing units at an average density of 550.2 per square mile (212.2/km2). The racial makeup of the village was 99.68% White, 0.07% Native American, 0.07% Asian, and 0.18% from two or more races. Hispanic or Latino of any race were 0.11% of the population.

There were 999 households, out of which 36.3% had children under the age of 18 living with them, 67.7% were married couples living together, 4.6% had a female householder with no husband present, and 25.1% were non-families. 23.7% of all households were made up of individuals, and 11.4% had someone living alone who was 65 years of age or older. The average household size was 2.69 and the average family size was 3.22.

In the village, the population was spread out, with 29.0% under the age of 18, 6.5% from 18 to 24, 27.3% from 25 to 44, 19.4% from 45 to 64, and 17.8% who were 65 years of age or older. The median age was 37 years. For every 100 females there were 94.7 males. For every 100 females age 18 and over, there were 90.3 males.

The median income for a household in the village was $57,315, and the median income for a family was $66,176. Males had a median income of $49,215 versus $27,826 for females. The per capita income for the village was $22,149. About 4.2% of families and 3.6% of the population were below the poverty line, including 0.4% of those under age 18 and 13.3% of those age 65 or over.

Religion
The local St. Augustine's Church is a prominent community landmark. The historic Roman Catholic Convent of the Sisters of the Precious Blood, Spiritual Center and Shrine of the Holy Relics is also located in nearby Maria Stein in neighboring Mercer County. The Catholic radio network Radio Maria USA operates Anna-licensed station WHJM with a local studio in Minster.

Education
Minster has a public library, a branch of the Auglaize County Public Library.

Notable people
 John Joseph Enneking, American landscape painter
 Mary Froning, American baseball player (AAGPBL)
 Katie Horstman, American baseball player (AAGPBL)
 Eli Wolf, former NFL tight end for the Baltimore Ravens

References

External links
 Village website
 Southwestern Auglaize Chamber of Commerce

Villages in Auglaize County, Ohio
Villages in Shelby County, Ohio
Villages in Ohio
Populated places established in 1832
German-American culture in Ohio
1832 establishments in Ohio